Esfid (also Romanized as Esfīd) is a village in Safiabad Rural District, Bam and Safiabad District, Esfarayen County, North Khorasan Province, Iran. At the 2006 census, its population was 756, in 203 families.

References 

Populated places in Esfarayen County